Victor Mishalow (born 4 April 1960) is an Australian born Canadian bandurist, educator, composer, conductor, and musicologist.

Biography 

Born 4 April 1960, in Sydney, Australia, Mishalow began studying the bandura in 1970 initially with Peter Deriashnyj playing in the Hnat Khotkevych Ukrainian Bandurist Ensemble and from 1974 with Hryhory Bazhul in Sydney. He was the first in Australia to do his practical HSC music performance exam at Carlingford High School on the bandura. 

In 1978 he received grants and scholarships from the Australia Council for the Arts and the NSW Premier's Department to undertake advanced studies in bandura in North America where he studied under Peter Honcharenko, Peter Kytasty, Hryhory Kytasty, Vasyl Yemetz and Leonid Haydamaka.

In 1979 he received a scholarship to attend the Kyiv Conservatory where he studied bandura under Professor Serhiy Bashtan, conducting under Professor Mykola Shchohol, and voice under Professor Maryna Yehorychev.

While in Kyiv he also attended evening classes at Kyiv University and privately studied traditional kobzar art under Heorhy Tkachenko.

Returning to Australia, Mishalow started to popularise bandura by forming trios and ensembles and organising seminars in Adelaide, Melbourne, Canberra, Sydney. He graduated from Sydney University in 1984 with a double major in Musicology and Ethno-musicology, continuing post-graduate studies at the Sydney College of Advanced Education Dip. Ed. (1986) in music education, and then the Kyiv Conservatory (1988) (M.Mus.). In February 2009 he successfully defended his Candidate of Science (equivalent to a PhD) dissertation on the "Cultural and artistic aspects of the genesis and development of performance on the Kharkiv bandura" at the Kharkiv State Academy of Culture. His opponents were Dr Igor Matsiyevsky from the Saint Petersburg Conservatory and Dr Mykola Davydov from the Kyiv Conservatory.

Mishalow has performed widely throughout Australia, North America and Europe. He has been associated with a variety of artists, and artistic groups such as the Tommy Tycho International Orchestra, the Toronto Symphony Orchestra and Orchestra Toronto, the Sydney Theatre Company, the Ukrainian Bandurist Chorus and numerous dance companies. His music has been aired in Australia on ABC Radio and non-commercial stations.

In 1988 he settled in Toronto, Ontario, Canada where he teaches bandura in musical schools, while also touring and performing as a soloist-instrumentalist. In 1991 he founded the Canadian Bandurist Capella

In 2013 he became an Adjunct Research Fellow at Monash University, Melbourne, Australia.

Awards 

Victor Mishalow was awarded the title of Merited Artist of Ukraine by Ukrainian president Leonid Kuchma in October, 1999. In August 2009 he was awarded the Order of Merit 3rd class, by Ukrainian president Viktor Yushchenko and the Medal of "Cossack Glory" from the Hetman of the Ukrainian Cossacks for his services to Ukrainian musical culture.

Recordings

Solo 

 1982 – Bandura – Yevshan YFP 1017
 1985 – Bandura 2 – Yevshan YFP 1035
 1986 – The Classical Bandura – Freefall Free-002
 1988 – Cossack songs of the 17-18th century – Yevshan 1050
 1989 – The Classical Bandura – Yevshan
 1990 – The Best of Bandura – Yevshan 1070
 1997 – Bandura Magic – Yevshan 1153
 1998 – Bandura Christmas Magic – Yevshan 1154

Compilations 

 1983 – The Huldre Folk
 1984 – The Huldre Folk – Adelaide Folk Festival
 1984 – The Huldre Folk – In concert
 1985 – Victor and Yuri – The Huldre Folk
 1985 – True Believers (with Paul Hemphill) – Freefall
 1986 – Victor and Yuri in Concert at the National Folk Festival
 1987 – The Drover's Dog (with Paul Hemphill) – Freefall
 1988 – The NorthWest Folklife Festival – Volume 10
 1988 – The Huldrefolk Live in London
 1991 – 20 years of Folklife CD (Seattle, USA)
 1993 – Other Worlds – The Ukrainian Bandura – Jack Straw Productions JSPOW3
 1996 – V. Kikta – Oratorio "Sacred Dnipro" (with Toronto Symphony Orchestra and Canadian-Ukrainian Opera Chorus).
 1999 – A Union of Strings CD – (Toronto, Ontario, Canada)
 2001 – Strings of Soul – Canadian Bandura Foundation
 2002 – Under the Skin (with Maia Kuze) – SMK Productions, SMKCD-0004

Videos 

 2001 – Playing the Bandura – Yevshan YV 201

Film music 

 1988 – Kobzar Viktor Mishalow (Kyiv television documentary films)
 1990 – Sledovat' na sever mozhet (Director Stanislav Klymenko)
 1998 – Millennium (Dir: H. Kuchmiy) national Film Board
 2001 – Strings of Soul (Canadian Bandura Foundation)
 2005 – Chervonyj Renaizan
 2009 – William Vetzal – Bandura maker
 2012 – She Paid the Ultimate Price
 2014 – Strings of Survival
 2014 – The Babas of Chernobyl

Compositions 

Victor Mishalow received the Australian Composers Fellowship Award from the Australia Arts Council in 1986.

Classical works 

 String trio (1977)
 String quartet (1983)
 Sonata (v-ln & piano) (1984)
 Sonata (piano) (1984)
 Rhapsody on Ukrainian folk themes (sym. orchestra) (1985)
 Slavonic Dance (sym. orchestra) (1986)
 Bandura concerto (1998) (3 movements)
 Elegy for William (2007) String trio
 Ukrainian Christmas Fantasy (sym. orchestra) (2014)

For bandura solo- 

 Spring song (1977)
 Ukrainian rhapsody (1981)
 Crimean fantasy (1983)
 24 etudes for the Kharkiv bandura (1984)
 Carpathian rhapsody (1988)
 Christmas fantasy (1991)
 The Bakhchisarai Fountain (1998)
 Folk-song variation sets («Взяв би я бандуру», «Ой не ходи Грицю», «Waltzing Matilda», «Greensleeves», «Гайдук»).

Vocal- 

Numerous vocal and choral works.

Selected articles 

 Мізинець В. – Про долю кобзарів у Радянській Україні //«Bandura», 1985, No.11/12, – С.31-37
 Мізинець В. – Корифей кобзарського мистецтва (Про І. Кучеренка) //«Bandura», 1985, No.13/14, – С.45-48
 Мізинець В. – Микола Домонтович //«Bandura», 1986, No.17/18, – С.55-57
 Mizynec V. – Folk Instruments of Ukraine – Bayda Books, Melbourne, Australia, 1987 – 48с.
 Мізинець В. – Трагічна доля видатного бандуриста (Про Гната Хоткевича) //«Bandura», 1988, No.23-24, – С.22-30
 Мізинець В. – Видатний будівник української культури //«Українські вісті» (Детройт) 10.IV.1988 – С.6
 Мішалов В. – Гнат Хоткевич – до 100 ліття народження //«Молода Україна», Торонто, Канада – листопад, 1977
 Mishalow V. – A Brief Description of the Zinkiv Method of Bandura Playing //«Bandura», 1982, No.2/6, – С.23-26
 Mishalow V. – The Kharkiv Style #1 – «Bandura», 1982, No.6, – С.15-22 #2 – «Bandura», 1985, No.13-14, – С.20-23 #3 – «Bandura», 1988, No.23-24, – С.31-34 #4 – «Bandura», 1987, No.19-20, – С.31-34 #5 – «Bandura», 1987, No.21-22, – С.34-35
 Мішалов В. – Початковий курс гри на бандурі харківського способу ч. 4 – //«Bandura» 1987, No.19-20, – С.29-31, ч. 5 – //«Bandura» 1987, No.21-22, – С.32-33, ч. 6 – //«Bandura» 1988, No.23-24, – С.56-58
 Мішалов В. – Останній кобзар – Нарис про Г. Ткаченка //«Bandura», 1985, No.13.14, – С.49-52
 Мішалов В. – Бандурист Леонід Гайдамака //«Bandura», 1986, No.17/18, – С.1-10
 Мішалов В. і М. – Українські кобзарі-бандуристи – Сідней, Австралія, 1986. – 132с.
 Мішалов В. – До 110 річчя з дня народження Г. Хоткевича // "Молода Україна", 1987, 17-21 грудня
 Мішалов В. і М. – Українські кобзарські думи – Сідней, Австралія, 1990. – 138с.
 Мішалов В. – Сторінки з історії Капелі Бандуристів ім. Т. Шевченка // Програма концертів по Україні 1991 – С.11-33
 Мішалов В. – Берегти свою спадщину //«Українська культура», No.9/10, 1994 – С.34-35
 Mishalow V. – A Short History of the Bandura // East European Meetings in Ethnomusicology 1999, Romanian Society for Ethnomusicology, Volume 6, – С.69-86
 Мішалов В. – "Музичні інструменти українського народу" Гната Хоткевича // вступна стаття у – Гнат Хоткевич – Музичні Інструменти Українського народу. Х.: 2002. Репринтне видання./ – С.5-9
 Мішалов В. – Кобзарська спадщина Гната Хоткевича у діаспорі // Традиції і сучасне в українській культурі /Тези доповідей Міжнародної науково-практичної конференції, присвяченої 125-річчю Гната Хоткевича/ X.: 2002. – С.97-98
 Мішалов В. – "Підручник гри на бандурі" Гната Хоткевича//вступна стаття у Гната Хоткевич – Підручник гри на бандурі/, Глас, Х.:2004 – С.3-17
 Мішалов В. – Леонід Гайдамака – Фундатор Бандурного професіоналізму – Матеріали міжнародної науково-практичної конференції – Кобзарство в контексті становлення української професійної культури, 14 жовтня, 2005 р. Київ., 2005. 206 с. (с.107-109)
 Мішалов, В.. – Бандура в еміграційних центрах у міжвоєнний період (с.95-103) – Karpacki Collage Artystyczny – Biuletyn – Przemysl, 2005
 Мішалов, В. – Гнат Хоткевича і його праця «Бандура та її можливості»//вступна стаття у Гната Хоткевич – «Бандура та її можливості»/, Глас, Х.:2007 – С.3-21
 Мішалов, В. – Практичні поради до виконання творів Гната Хоткевича на бандурі харківського типу – // Гнат Хоткевич – «Твори для Харківської бандури» Глас, Х.:2007 – С.146-191
 Мішалов В. – Видатний будівничий бандурного мистецтва – Гнат Хоткевич // Гнат Хоткевич – «Твори для Харківської бандури» Глас, Х.:2007 – С.192-241
 Mishalow V. – Hnat Khotkevych and the Bandura // Гнат Хоткевич – «Твори для Харківської бандури» Глас, Х.:2007 – p. 242-299
 Мішалов В.  До 130–річчя кобзаря Івана Кучугури–Кучеренка, громадського діяча і благовісника Української автокефальної православної церкви / Україна молода Номер 123 за 08.07.2008 About I. Kucherenko
 Мішалов В. Праця Гната Хоткевича — «Бандура та її конструція» // вступна стаття до видання «Гнат Хоткевич — Бандура та її конструкція» // Харків: Фонд національно-культурних ініціатив імені Гната Хоткевича, 2010 — С.3-18.
 Мішалов В. Виробництво бандури в Діаспорі // «Гнат Хоткевич — Бандура та її конструкція» // Харків: Фонд національно-культурних ініціатив імені Гната Хоткевича, 2010 — С.123-127.
 Мішалов В. Номенклатура частин бандури // «Гнат Хоткевич — Бандура та її конструкція» // Харків: Фонд національно-культурних ініціатив імені Гната Хоткевича, 2010 — С.128-133
 Мішалов В. Думки відносно конструкції та удосконалення бандури // «Гнат Хоткевич — Бандура та її конструкція» // Харків: Фонд національно-культурних ініціатив імені Гната Хоткевича, 2010 — С.245-268.
 Mishalow V. Bill Vetzal – Master bandura maker // «Гнат Хоткевич — Бандура та її конструкція» // Харків: Фонд національно-культурних ініціатив імені Гната Хоткевича, 2010 — С.266-269.
 Мішалов В. Список майстрів бандури харківського типу // «Гнат Хоткевич — Бандура та її конструкція» // Харків: Фонд національно-культурних ініціатив імені Гната Хоткевича, 2010 — С.270-272.
 Мішалов В. Культурно-мистецькі аспекти ґенези і розвитку виконавства на Харківській бандурі // Давидов М. Виконавське мистецтво – Енциклопедичний довідник // Київ. Національна музична академія України ім. П. І. Чайковського, 2010 — С.277 – 287.
 Mishalow V. The Bandura and Kobzardom in Ukraine Today // Bulletin of the Kyiv National University of Culture and Arts ?? Series in Musical Art . Issue 1, 2018 pp. 83–89
 Мішалов В. Бандура і кобзарство в Україні сьогодні // Вісник Київського національного університету культури і мистецтв Вип 1, 2018, 2017. – 240 с. (с-83-89)
 Mishalow V. Heorhiy Tkachenko and informed performance practice on the traditional Bandura  // Кобзарська-лірницька епічна традиція – Збірник наукових праць науково-практичної конференції з міжнародною участю. 15-16 червня 2019 року. К. , НЦНК "Музей Івана Гончара". (pp 66–76)
 Мішалов В. Проблематика походження шкіл і способів гри на бандурі  // Кобзарська-лірницька епічна традиція – Збірник наукових праць науково-практичної конференції з міжнародною участю. 15-16 червня 2019 року. К. , НЦНК "Музей Івана Гончара". (ст. 124 – 129)
 Мішалов В. Традиція, трансформація та інновація в бандурному виконавстві української діаспори Австралії   // Вісник Київського національного університету культури і мистецтв – Серія: Музичне мистецтво К. 2019. (ст. 163 – 174)
 Mishalow V. Tradition, Transformation and Innovation in Bandura Playing in the Ukrainian Diaspora of Australia     // Вісник Київського національного університету культури і мистецтв – Серія: Музичне мистецтво К. 2019. (ст. 163 – 174)
 Mishalow V. Tradition and Innovation in the Bandura performances of Vasyl Yemetz.  // Вісник Київського національного університету культури і мистецтв — Серія: Музичне мистецтво К. 2020. (ст. 59–71)
 Мішалов В. Спогади про зустрічі з бандуристом Василем Ємцем // Синергія виконавця і слухача в кобзарсько-лірницькій традиції – Збірник наукових праць науково-практичної з міжнародною участю. (Київ – Харків, 6 червня 2019 року.) К. , НЦНК «Музей Івана Гончара». Х. 2020. (ст. 136–145)
 Mishalow V. Tradition and Innovation in the Bandura performances of Vasyl Yemetz.  // Синергія виконавця і слухача в кобзарсько-лірницькій традиції – Збірник наукових праць науково-практичної з міжнародною участю. (Київ – Харків, 6 червня 2019 року.) К. , НЦНК «Музей Івана Гончара». Х. 2020. (ст. 146–156)

Books 
 Mizynec V. – Folk Instruments of Ukraine – Bayda Books, Melbourne, Australia, 1987 – 48с.
 Мішалов В. – Видатний будівничий бандурного мистецтва – Гнат Хоткевич – Сідней, Австралія. 1983 – 68с.
 Мішалов В. і М. – Українські кобзарі-бандуристи – Сідней, Австралія, 1986 – 106с.
 Мішалов В. – Збірник творів для харківської бандури N.Y: TUB, 1986 – 48с.
 Mishalow V. – Collection of works for Kharkiv Bandura – Society of Ukrainian Bandurists, NY, USA, 1986 – 48с.
 Хоткевич Гнат "Підручник гри на бандурі" // Глас, Х.:2004 – С.3-17
 Гнат Хоткевич – «Бандура та її можливості» Вип 1.// Глас, Х.:2007 – С.92
 Гнат Хоткевич – «Твори для Харківської бандури» Вип. 2// Глас, Х.:2007 – С.254
 Гнат Хоткевич – «Бандура та її репертуар» Вип. 3// Харків: Фонд національно-культурних ініціатив імені Гната Хоткевича, 2009 — С.268
 Мішалов В. (ред. упорядник та передмова) Г. М. Хоткевича – Вибрані твори для бандури Вип. 4. // Фонд національно-культурних ініціатив імені Гната Хоткевича Торонто-Харків: 2010. 112 С.
 «Гнат Хоткевич — Бандура та її конструкція» Вип. 5// Харків: Фонд національно-культурних ініціатив імені Гната Хоткевича, 2010 — С.289.
 Мішалов Віктор – «Харківська бандура» // видавець О. Савчук, Х.:2013 – С.352

External links and resources

References

Bibliography 

 Кравченко, П. "Віктор Мішалов – бандурист ("Victor Mishalow – bandurist"), Альманах українського життя в Австралії'' (pp 892–894) Sydney, 1994
 Литвин, М. – Струни золотії – "Веселка", К.:1994 (117с.)
 Markus V. (ed) Encyclopedia of the Ukrainian Diaspora Vol 4. (Australia-Asia-Africa) Австралія-Азія-Африка) Shevchenko Scientific Society and the National Academy of Sciences of Ukraine, Kyiv—New York—Chicago—Melbourne, p. 40 1995  (Ukrainian)
 Австралийский музыкант Виктор Мишалов

1960 births
Living people
Bandurists
Kobzarstvo
Canadian people of Ukrainian descent
Composers for bandura
Ukrainian musicians
Recipients of the title of Merited Artist of Ukraine
Australian people of Ukrainian descent
Chevaliers of the Order of Merit (Ukraine)
20th-century Ukrainian musicians
21st-century Ukrainian musicians